Cecil Fielding White (December 12, 1900 – March 29, 1992) was an American farmer and politician. As a Democrat, White served as the U.S. representative for California's 9th congressional district for one term, from 1949 to 1951. White was a cotton broker and owned his own ranch before getting into politics at the age of 47, and defeating seven-term incumbent Republican Bertrand W. Gearhart.

Background
White was born in Temple, Texas, on December 12, 1900, the son of James Bernard and Massie (née Bedford) White. His family moved to Fort Smith, Arkansas, where White grew up and went through the city's public schooling system. At the age of sixteen, he joined the Arkansas Army National Guard and served on the border with Mexico during the Pancho Villa Expedition. During World War I, White fought in France as a sergeant in the 142nd Field Artillery Regiment, After the war, White worked in the Los Angeles office of a cotton broker and later worked with cotton mills in Arkansas, California and Tennessee. After going back to California, he became the owner and operator of his own ranch, under his name in Devils Den, California.

He married Mildred Willis, and they had four childred: Millicent, Donald, Douglas, and Bertram.

Politics
As a 47-year-old cotton rancher, White ran for the United States House of Representatives seat in California's 9th congressional district. He faced seven-term Republican incumbent Bertrand W. Gearhart in the election. Gearhart had faced one Democratic challenger in his six previous re-election bids. White defeated Gearhart after capturing a 51.3% majority with a margin of victory of more than 6,000 votes. White was challenged in 1950 by Republican Allan O. Hunter. Hunter defeated White, 52.0% to 48%.  After leaving Congress White returned to his cotton growing business.

White again ran for a seat in the House of Representatives in 1966, this time as the Republican nominee for California's 16th congressional district. Democratic incumbent Bernice F. Sisk defeated White in a lopsided 71.3%–28.6% election.

White remained a resident of San Francisco, California, until his death on March 29, 1992.  His remains were cremated.

References

External links

Cecil F. White at The Political Graveyard

1900 births
1992 deaths
Members of the United States House of Representatives from California
San Francisco Bay Area politicians
California Republicans
20th-century American politicians
Democratic Party members of the United States House of Representatives from California